Paraguay at the 1968 Summer Olympics in Mexico City, Mexico was the nation's second appearance out of sixteen editions at the time at the Summer Olympic Games.  One competitor, Rodolfo da Ponte, took part in the individual foil fencing.

Fencing

Ranks given are within the group.

See also
Paraguay at the 1967 Pan American Games

References

External links
Official Olympic Reports

Nations at the 1968 Summer Olympics
1968
1968 in Paraguayan sport